This is a list of Norwegian football transfers in the winter transfer window 2013–14 by club. Only clubs of the 2014 Tippeligaen  and the 2014 Norwegian First Division are included.

2014 Tippeligaen

Aalesund

In:

Out:

Bodø/Glimt

In:

Out:

Brann

In:

Out:

Haugesund

In:

Out:

Lillestrøm

In:

Out:

Molde

In:

Out:

Odd

In:

Out:

Rosenborg

In:

Out:

Sandnes Ulf

In:

Out:

Sarpsborg 08

In:

Out:

Sogndal

In:

Out:

Stabæk

In:

Out:

Start

In:

Out:

Strømsgodset

In:

Out:

Viking

In:

Out:

Vålerenga

In:

Out:

1. Divisjon

Alta

In:

Out:

Bryne

In:

Out:

Bærum

In:

Out:

Fredrikstad

In:

Out:

HamKam

In:

Out:

Hødd

In:

Out:

Hønefoss

In:

Out:

Kristiansund

In:

Out:

Mjøndalen

In:

Out:

Nest-Sotra

In:

Out:

Ranheim

In:

Out:

Sandefjord

In:

Out:

Strømmen

In:

Out:

Tromsdalen

In:

Out:

Tromsø

In:

Out:

Ull/Kisa

In:

Out:

References

Norway
Transfers
Transfers
2013–14